Mumba Devi Mandir is an old temple in Mumbai, Maharashtra, India dedicated to the goddess , the local incarnation of the Devi (Mother Goddess). The Marathi  derives from Sanskrit. Mumba Devi is the goddess of the city of Mumbai. The name Mumbai is derived from Mumba Devi. While Hindu sects devoted to the goddess Mumbadevi are attested to as far back as the 15th century, it is said that the temple was built in 1675 near the main landing site of the former Bori Bunder creek against the north wall of the English Fort Saint George by a Hindu woman also named Mumba. The creek and fort are now deteriorated to a point at which they are but derelict reminders of the city's past. The temple, on the other hand, is still active.

The goddess Mumba was patron of the Marathi speeking Koli people, the original inhabitants of the Seven Islands of Bombay. She is depicted as a black stone sculpture in the temple. An etymology of Mumba that is popular is "Maha Amba," or "Great Mother," one of the many of India's more well-known names for the Hindu Mother Goddess (Devi). Located in Bhuleshwar area in South Mumbai, the temple is in the heart of the steel and clothing markets. It is a sacred pilgrimage spot and place of worship for Hindus and is thus visited daily by hundreds of people. It is not uncommon for visitors of Mumbai to pay their respects at the temple and is one of the tourist attractions of Mumbai.

History

This temple was built in honour of the Goddess Amba. The Mumbadevi temple is six centuries old. The first Mumbadevi temple was situated at Bori Bunder, and is believed to have been destroyed between 1739 and 1770. After the destruction a new temple was erected at the same place at Bhuleshwar. The Goddess personifies Mother Earth and is still worshipped by the Hindu population of the northern Indo-Gangetic plain and southern India alike. The original temple built at the site where the Victoria Terminus station earlier was by Koli fishermen was demolished around 1737 and a new temple was erected in its place at Phansi Talao. The modern shrine contains an image of the Goddess Mumbadevi dressed in a robe with a silver crown, a nose stud and a golden necklace. To the left is a stone figure of Annapurna seated on a peacock. In front of the shrine is a tiger, the carrier of the Goddess.

The present name of the city is derived from the Goddess Mumbadevi. The temple itself is not impressive but is an important landmark as it is dedicated to Mumba Devi, the city's patron deity. The international name of the City is Bombay. 'Bombay' is an anglicized version of the Portuguese name used by the British when they took control of the city in the 17th century. The name the city was referred to as Bom Bahia, meaning 'good bay'.

Legend
The temple is dedicated to goddess Parvati (also known as Gauri) in her fisherwoman form. To take the form of Mahakali, goddess Parvati had to gain perseverance and concentration. At that time Lord Shiva (husband of goddess Parvati) insisted goddess Parvati to reincarnate in the form of a fisherwoman by which she can gain the ability of perseverance and concentration as a fisherman gains both these qualities while learning fishing. Goddess Parvati then incarnated as a fisher woman and took hermitage at the place of fishermen (current location—Mumbai). Goddess Parvati at her early age was known as Matsya and later she came to be known as Mumba in her fisherwoman form. Mumba dedicated herself in learning perseverance and concentration under the guidance of fishermen as they were keen in their profession of catching fishes by concentration and perseverance. When Mumba mastered the techniques of perseverance and concentration, the time came for her to return to her abode from where she had come. Lord Shiva came in the form of fisherman and married Mumba realising, who she truly was. Later the fishermen requested her to stay there forever and so she became the village goddess (grama devata). As she was signified as "Aai" (meaning 'mother' in Marathi) by the people living there, she came to be known as Mumba Aai. And Mumbai got its name from her.

Places to see
The Mumbadevi road is to the right from the northern end of Zaveri Bazaar. It is a narrow street lined with stalls selling a spectrum of objects associated with Hindu religion – copper bracelets, rings, rudrakska malas, brass lingams, photographs of deities, incense, saffron and so on. Ochre clad sadhus flit along the street, their foreheads smeared with ash paste and vermilion.

References

External links
 

Hindu temples in Mumbai